Her Fatal Millions is a 1923 American Metro Pictures silent comedy film directed by William Beaudine. It stars
Viola Dana, Huntley Gordon, and Allan Forrest. It is not known if the film currently survives, which suggests that it is a lost film.

Cast
Viola Dana as Mary Bishop
Huntley Gordon as Fred Garrison 
Allan Forrest as Lew Carmody
Peggy Browne as Louise Carmody
Edward Connelly as Amos Bishop
Kate Price as Mary Applewin
Joy Winthrop as the Landlady

References

External links
 

1923 films
1923 comedy films
Silent American comedy films
American silent feature films
American black-and-white films
Films directed by William Beaudine
Metro Pictures films
1920s American films